Parliamentary elections were held in Mauritania on 23 November. The opposition has vowed to boycott the election unless the president steps down beforehand. A total of 1,096 candidates have registered to compete for the leadership of 218 local councils across Mauritania, whilst 438 candidates are contesting for the 146 parliamentary seats. Some 1.2 million Mauritanians were eligible to vote in the election. The first round results yielded a landslide victory for the ruling UPR winning 56 seats and their 14 coalition partners winning 34 seats. The Islamist Tewassoul party won 12 seats. The remaining seats were contested in a runoff on 21 December 2013. The UPR won the majority with 75 seats in the Assembly.

Background
The elections were originally set for 1 October 2011, then delayed several times to 16 October 2011, 31 March 2012, May 2012, October 2013 and November/December 2013, due to continuous disputes between the government and opposition parties.

Contesting parties
A total of 74 parties took part. Tewassoul was the only member of the 11 party opposition alliance known as the Coordination of the Democratic Opposition (COD) to  take part. The COD's boycott had been criticised by the ruling UPR, with Ould Mohamed Lemine saying such action was unjustifiable "in view of the political and electoral reforms accomplished."

The main contestants are seen to be the UPR, Tewassoul, and the People's Progressive Alliance.

Campaign
The two-week campaign period began on Friday 8 November. The beginning of the campaign was greeted with fireworks, car honking, and loud music in the streets, in the capital of Nouakchott.

Mohamed Mahmoud Ould Mohamed Lemine called for Mauritanians to give the Union for the Republic a majority in parliament so that they could support the program of President Mohamed Ould Abdel Aziz. The UPR is also the only party fielding a contestant in every constituency. The UPR has also criticized Tewassoul for its links to the Muslim Brotherhood, and has called for the movement to dissociate itself from Islamists elsewhere.

Tewassoul has described its participation as a struggle against what it deems the dictatorship of President Mohamed Oul Abdel Aziz, and Party President Mohamed Jemil Ould Mansour has called for a huge turnout by Tewassoul supporters.

Thousands of supporters of the COD marched in Nouakchott on 6 November to protest against the election.

Results
Following the first round of voting, on 23 November, Tewassoul president Jemil Ould Mansour claimed at a party news conference that the party had found "serious irregularities" including ballot stuffing and voting being carried out after the count. Mansour claimed these irregularities could discredit the election, and stated that the party had sent a delegation to the electoral commission to complain. He did not say which parties he believed to have benefited from the alleged irregularities.

References

Elections in Mauritania
Parliamentary
Mauritania
Mauritania
Mauritania